Palestinian displacement in East Jerusalem is the transfer of Palestinian residents from the city due to Israeli policies aimed at an Israeli-Jewish demographic majority. Many Palestinian families in East Jerusalem have been affected by "forced relocation processes or been involved in lengthy legal procedures to revoke an eviction order."  According to OCHA, between a third to a half of East Jerusalem's houses do not have permits, potentially placing over 100,000 Palestinian residents of the city at risk of forced displacement and forcible transfer as a result of demolitions.

Aryeh King, a deputy mayor of Jerusalem said that the evictions were part of a municipal strategy to create "layers of Jews" throughout East Jerusalem.  The United Nations Human Rights Office urged Israel to call off pending evictions in East Jerusalem, warning that its actions could amount to war crimes. “We call on Israel to immediately call off all forced evictions,” UN rights office spokesman Rupert Colville. International humanitarian law prohibits the confiscation of private property and that evictions of the Palestinian families could constitute a war crime. Human Rights Watch says the government enforces policy to "maintain the domination by Jewish Israelis over Palestinians".

Background 

Traditionally land was held in communal ownership (musha). A combination of the effects of an Ottoman land reform enacted in 1858 together with the ensuing penetration of modern capital investment began to erode much of customary land rights.  The pace of change increased when Great Britain became the Mandatory power in Palestine. The Balfour Declaration (1917) had undertaken to ensure the establishment of a national home for Jews, and, with the passing of a Land Transfer Ordinance in 1921, which severed the customary link between land occupancy and land ownership,  the World Zionist Organization, through the Jewish National Fund (JNF) and the Jewish Agency for Israel (1929), the purchase of land, especially from absentee Lebanese, Syrian and Egyptian entrepreneurs,  carried with it the possibility of evicting its tenants.   By 1930 roughly 10% of the country's rural population were tenants, increasingly vulnerbale to eviction. 

In 1948, Palestinians lost an estimated 7,000,000 dunams of property redefined as Israeli land, with 750,000 of them also displaced from their homes, and about 400 Palestinian towns and villages were depopulated, in areas which fell under Israeli control. In West Jerusalem the overwhelming mass of the wealthy Palestinian community, some 28,000, of which only roughly 750 (mostly Greeks and Christians) were permitted to remain, fled or was expelled and their property was ransacked, subsequently confiscated and distributed to Jews.  At the same time, on the advice of the Haganah and with a subsequent recommendation by the British authorities, two small communities of Jews were evacuated from Sheikh Jarrah and, in compensation given homes in West Jerusalem that had been owned by Palestinians. 10,000 mostly fully furnished Palestinian homes in the western sector of Jerusalem alone were occupied and their original owners and Palestinians with property in other parts of Mandatory Palestine and what later became Israel are denied the right to reclaim their property. In 1970, on the other hand, Israel enacted a law to allow Jews to reclaim property which they owned in East Jerusalem, despite having already been given expropriated Palestinian-owned property in compensation. This asymmetry has been pointed out by numerous observers.

This arrangement does not exist in the rest of the West Bank, as the Israeli government decided that it would create tension, risk public order and lead to equivalent and much more numerous claims by West Bank Palestinians to reclaim their property in Israel.

Timeline
On June 8, 2021, UN Secretary-General Antonio Guterres urged Israeli authorities to stop demolitions of Palestinian properties in occupied East Jerusalem.

On 30 June 2021 a US Department of State spokesperson said "We believe it is important to refrain from any steps that may increase tensions and make diplomatic agreements more difficult, and this also applies to home demolitions".

On 5 July 2021, a European Union statement concerning developments in Silwan and Sheikh Jarrah said that "Israel’s settlement policy is illegal under international law" and that "Unilateral actions taken in that context, such as forced transfers, evictions, demolitions and confiscations of homes will only escalate an already tense environment and lead to further violence and human suffering. The Israeli authorities should immediately cease these activities and provide adequate permits for legal construction and development of Palestinian communities."

On July 28, 2021, Ir Amim Executive Director Dr. Yudith Oppenheimer briefed  the United Nations Security Council about displacement of the Palestinian communities Sheikh Jarrah, Batn al-Hawa and al-Bustan in Silwan, and al-Walaja.

On 30 August 2021, Special Coordinator Tor Wennesland briefed the  Security Council and stated "I urge Israel to cease the demolition and seizure of Palestinian property throughout the occupied West Bank, including East Jerusalem, in line with its obligations under international humanitarian law."

In the week ending 15 October 2021, planned settlements have been advanced for Givat HaMatos, E1, Atarot and Har Homa, all four plans previously announced by the Netanyahu government February 2020 after years of being frozen because of international objections. According to Ir Amim the plans are designed to predetermine the outcome of any negotiated political resolution. The US State Department said it was formulating a response.

In January, 2022, Israel indefinitely postponed debate on the E1 area. On 20 January 2022, in a statement, France, Germany, Italy and Spain urged Israeli authorities to stop new construction in East Jerusalem. They said that hundreds of new buildings "constitute an additional obstacle to the two-state solution," and would further disconnect the occupied West Bank from East Jerusalem. EU spokesperson Peter Stano pointed to a Jerusalem municipality decision to "advance a plan for the construction of more than 1,450 settlement-housing units" and said that this "undermines the possibility of Jerusalem serving as the future capital of both States." The United Nations Special Coordinator for the Middle East Peace Process Tor Wennesland referred to four building plans being advanced and said that "all settlements are illegal under international law and remain a substantial obstacle to peace."

National parks and settlements
The creation of Israeli settlements in Palestinian neighborhoods and expropriation of land for roads, archaeological excavations, tourism projects, and national parks has been used since the late 1980s to increase Israeli presence in East Jerusalem. The Israeli military order (IMO) regarding Nature Protection (Judea and Samaria) (No. 363), 5730 – 1969, governs use of areas designated as nature reserves, based on similar Israeli laws. According to a European Union Heads of Mission report, "East Jerusalem is the only place where Israeli national parks are declared on populated neighbourhoods,"

International law
The international community considers East Jerusalem to be Palestinian territory held under Israeli occupation. Israel effectively annexed the territory and considers it part of its capital city, though this move has been rejected by the international community. The Office of the United Nations High Commissioner for Human Rights (OHCHR) has called on Israel to stop all forced evictions of Palestinians from Sheikh Jarrah, saying that if carried out the expulsions of the Palestinians would violate Israel's responsibilities under international law which prohibit the transfer of civilians in to or out of occupied territory by the occupying power. A spokesman for the OHCHR said that such transfers may constitute a "war crime". Human rights organizations have been critical of Israeli efforts to remove Palestinians from Sheikh Jarrah, with Human Rights Watch releasing a statement saying that the disparate rights between Palestinian and Jewish residents of East Jerusalem "underscores the reality of apartheid that Palestinians in East Jerusalem face." Israeli human rights group estimate that over 1,000 Palestinian families are at risk of eviction in East Jerusalem.

The European Union considers that Israel is "actively pursuing the illegal annexation" of East Jerusalem. According to the EU, Israeli actions increase Jewish Israeli presence in East Jerusalem and weaken the Palestinian community in the city. The EU has raised its concerns over Israeli house demolitions in East Jerusalem using diplomatic channels. According to the EU, demolitions are "illegal under international law, serve no obvious purpose, have severe humanitarian effects, and fuel bitterness and extremism". The EU says that the fourth Geneva convention prevents an occupying power extending its jurisdiction to occupied territory, such as East Jerusalem, which the Palestinians claim as the capital of their future state. In 2011, EU envoys in the Middle East reported to Brussels that various Israeli policies amounted to "systematically undermining the Palestinian presence" in Jerusalem. According to the United Kingdom, "attempts by Israel to alter the character or demography of East Jerusalem are unacceptable and extremely provocative."

Richard Falk, Special Rapporteur for the UN on the occupied Palestinian territories, said in 2011 that "the continued pattern of settlement expansion in East Jerusalem combined with forcible eviction of long residing Palestinians are creating an intolerable situation that can only be described, in its cumulative impact, as a form of ethnic cleansing". Falk said that Israel's actions reveal systematic discrimination against Palestinian residents of the city, and recommended that the International Court of Justice assess allegations that Israel's occupation of the West Bank, including East Jerusalem, possesses elements of apartheid and ethnic cleansing.

According to an April 2021 report by Human Rights Watch, "Beyond formal state confiscation, discriminatory laws and policies enable settler and settler organizations to take possession of Palestinian homes, evict the Palestinian landowners, and transfer their property to Jewish owners in East Jerusalem neighborhoods."

Settler organizations
In the 1990s and 2000s U.S. philanthropy became more partisan, donating to settler organizations and donors recruited to acquire properties for Jews in Arab sections of East Jerusalem.

Evictions

The data for the year 2016 has been tabulated as follows:

As of May 29, 2021 in East Jerusalem, there are 218 Palestinian households (970 persons) with eviction cases. Sheikh Jarrah is 8(75) and Batn al-Hawa (Silwan) is 7(44).
Palestinians have called the attempted evictions "ethnic cleansing".

Demolitions

According to Peace Now, about 20,000 Palestinian homes are under threat of demolition because their owners built them without obtaining planning permission, which is often denied to Palestinians.

In 2020, the 170 demolitions in East Jerusalem was the second-highest number of demolitions after 2016 since the UN began recording in 2009.

See also 
 2021 Israel–Palestine crisis
 Sheikh Jarrah controversy
 City of David (Silwan)

Notes

Citations

Sources

 

Israeli settlement
Israeli–Palestinian conflict in Jerusalem
Legal disputes
West Bank